"The Chinese Way" is a single released in 1983 by the British band Level 42. It was the third single from their album, The Pursuit of Accidents, which was the band's most successful album up to that time. It was Level 42's first top-30 single in the United Kingdom.

Charts

References

1983 singles
Level 42 songs
Songs written by Mark King (musician)
Songs written by Phil Gould (musician)
Songs written by Wally Badarou
Albums produced by Mike Vernon (record producer)
1983 songs
Songs about China